Lauren Doyle (born February 23, 1991) is an American rugby sevens player. She won a silver medal at the 2015 Pan American Games as a member of the United States women's national rugby sevens team and represented the United States in Rugby sevens at the 2016 Summer Olympics.

Doyle captained the U.S. Eagles sevens team at the 2022 Rugby World Cup Sevens in Cape Town.

References

External links 
 Lauren Doyle at USA Rugby
 
 
 
 
 

1991 births
Living people
Female rugby sevens players
American female rugby sevens players
United States international rugby sevens players
Rugby sevens players at the 2015 Pan American Games
Pan American Games silver medalists for the United States
Pan American Games medalists in rugby sevens
Rugby sevens players at the 2016 Summer Olympics
Olympic rugby sevens players of the United States
Eastern Illinois University alumni
Sportspeople from Illinois
Eastern Illinois Panthers athletes
Medalists at the 2015 Pan American Games
Rugby sevens players at the 2020 Summer Olympics

American LGBT sportspeople